Kerala People's Arts Club, abbreviated as KPAC, is a theatrical movement in Kayamkulam, Kerala, India. It was formed in the 1950s by a group of individuals having close ties with the Communist Party of India in Kerala. KPAC was very influential in popularising the Communist movement in Kerala.

In 1951, KPAC staged its first drama, Ente Makanaanu Sheri (My Son is Right). The songs of this play were written by Punaloor Balan. Its second drama Ningalenne Communistakki (You Made Me a Communist), first performed in 1952, became a path-breaking play in the history of Malayalam theatre. The play was penned by the renowned playwright Thoppil Bhasi, under the pseudonym Soman. Bhasi was underground when he wrote the play. The success of Ningalenne Communistakki made KPAC in the forefront of a powerful people's theatre movement in Kerala.

KPAC played a significant role in popularising the Communist Party in Kerala through its dramas, road shows and kathaprasangams (story telling).

References

External links

Youtube Channel
The Hindu article
Thyagaraja School of Music

Organisations based in Kerala
Theatrical organisations in India
Arts organizations established in 1950
1950 establishments in India